Jacques Chirac (1932–2019) was the 22nd President of France and Prime Minister of France.

Chirac may also refer to:
 Bernadette Chirac (born 1933), wife of Jacques Chirac
 Their two daughters, Claude Chirac (born 1962) and Laurence (1958–2016)

Chirac is also the name or part of the name of several communes in France:
 Chirac, Charente, in the Charente department
 Chirac, Lozère, in the Lozère department
 Chirac-Bellevue, in the Corrèze department
 Saint-Bonnet-de-Chirac, in the Lozère department

See also
 "Chiraq", a nickname of Chicago
 Chi-Raq, 2015 film set in Chicago and revolves around its street gangs